Akron Family
 Arizona Parenting
 Bay Area Parent
 Boston Parents Paper
 Broward Family Life
 Colorado Parent
 Columbus Parent
 Family Life
 FamilyFun
 Gay Parent
 Hip Mama
 Kidsguide
 LA Parent
 MetroKids Magazine
 Mothering
 OC Family
 Parents
 PDX Parent Portland, Oregon
 Scholastic Parent & Child
 Tidewater Parent Magazine
 Today's Parent USA
 Today's Parent
 Upstate Parent
 Westchester Family
 Working Mother